Fluoroethane (also known as Ethyl fluoride) is a hydrofluorocarbon with the chemical formula ). It is a volatile derivative of ethane. It appears as a colourless, odorless flammable gas at room temperature. Fluoroethane can also cause asphyxiation by the displacement of oxygen in air.

Reactivity 
Fluoroethane is incompatible with most strong reducing agents and oxidizers. Also, may be incompatible with many amines, nitrides, azo/diazo compounds, with alkali metals, and with epoxides. It is part of the wider class of substances known as fluorinated organic compounds.

See also 

 F-Gases
 List of Refrigerants

References 

Hydrochlorofluorocarbons